Talaash: The Hunt Begins... is a 2003 Indian Hindi-language action thriller film starring Akshay Kumar and Kareena Kapoor. It is directed by Suneel Darshan and produced by Pahlaj Nihalani.

Plot 
 
Babu (Suresh Oberoi) works for a gang that is led by Chhote Pathan (Kabir Bedi) and his men Rajjo Singh (Raj Babbar) and D.K Sharma (Dalip Tahil). Babu knows many of the gang's secrets, and Chhote promises him that if he keeps his mouth shut, they will look after his family; they betray him. He is rescued by an honest police inspector (Ashish Vidyarthi). Babu returns home to find that his wife Poornima (Raakhee), Arjun (his son), and Pooja (his daughter) live a destitute life from Chhote's betrayal. He tells Poornima that they betrayed him for his silence and swears vengeance. He then teams up with the inspector and reveals the locations of their deals, and many gang members are arrested. Chhote finds Babu hiding and threatens him. He and his men take him to Babu's home, and punish him in front of Poornima and her children. Arjun is out doing his job to earn money, and only Poornima and Pooja are present at home. Poornima begs Chhote to forgive them and promises to leave the city. Chhote grabs Pooja and then tells Poornima that he will take his daughter with them, raise her for 10–12 years, then sell her. Babu tries to save his daughter and Chhote decapitates him. Pooja screams for help when she sees her brother returning home from work. He fails to follow her, and he runs back home to find his father dead and his mother having a mental breakdown; she considers Pooja's toy doll her daughter and does not recognize Arjun. Arjun goes to the inspector, who cannot find Chhote or Pooja. He tells Arjun that they have completely disappeared and may have fled the city. Arjun promises that he will not give up and promises to search for his sister.

Ten years later, Poornima is housed in a mental hospital, and Arjun (Akshay Kumar) has become a high-profile vigilante. He works for the police inspector, now the Commissioner of Police, by exposing illegal firearms transactions. The Commissioner of Police tells Arjun that he finds a clue that may lead him to Pooja. He tells Arjun how after Chhote and his gang murdered his father, fled the city and reached the city of Ghaziabad, Chhote and Rajjo were killed in a police chase. D.K. Sharma took over the gang and disappeared, and there has been no news of him since. He learned about Shetty (Rami Reddy), a famous arms smuggler who was once Chhote's driver. Arjun finds Shetty and asks where his sister is. Shetty tells him that Sharma knows, and tries to shoot Arjun, but is shot by the Commissioner instead. From the police control room, they see Sharma arriving from a flight, and him taking a girl named Tina (Kareena Kapoor) on a Rajasthan tour.

Arjun catches Sharma and interrogates him. Sharma says that Rajjo is still alive and knows where his sister is, and Tina is his daughter. Arjun drops Sharma to his death.

Back at the police control room, the Commissioner shows camera footage proving Rajjo is alive. Arjun travels to South Africa and meets Sardar Vichitra Singh (Gulshan Grover), and tells him that he has come to find Rajjo.

Arjun reveals to Tina her father's identity. Tina confronts Rajjo, and he realizes his mistakes. Before he can reveal where Chhote has kept Pooja, he is shot and dies in Tina's arms. Tina tells Arjun to follow Rocky. Chhote makes an appearance, and Arjun kills him and Rocky. Arjun comes back to India with Pooja and reunites with Tina and his family.

Cast 
 Akshay Kumar as Arjun Raichand 
 Kareena Kapoor as Tina
 Pooja Batra as Kamini 
 Suresh Oberoi as Babu Raichand 
 Raakhee as Purnima Raichand
 Kabir Bedi as Chhote Pathan
 Rami Reddy as Shetty
 Gulshan Grover as Sardarji, Vichitra Singh
 Shakti Kapoor as Upadhyay
 Dalip Tahil as D.K. Sharma
 Ashish Vidyarthi as Police Commissioner
 Sharat Saxena as Black John, Mafia Don
 Jeetu Verma as Junior, Black John Brother
 Raj Babbar as Rajjo Singh
 Arbaaz Ali Khan as Rocky (Chhote Pathan's henchman)
 Anirudh Agarwal
 Razak Khan as Razak Khan, a TT
 Upasana Singh
 Vrajesh Hirjee as Pepsi
 Dinesh Hingoo as Astrologer in Train
 Viju Khote as Popatbhai
 Supriya Karnik as Kokilaben
 Kunika
 Veeru Krishnan as Mummy
 Dolly Bindra
 Rakesh Bedi

References

External links 
 
 

2003 films
2003 action thriller films
2000s Hindi-language films
Films scored by Sanjeev Darshan
Films about arms trafficking
Films about the illegal drug trade
Films about prostitution in India
Films directed by Suneel Darshan
Indian action thriller films
Films about the Narcotics Control Bureau